PatnaBeats is an online media company from India. The company aims to revive the lost glory of Bihar. Its tag line is: "Redefining the word 'Bihar', together!"

The company fights the stereotyping of Bihar and Biharis by publishing positive media content on people, art, architecture, culture, history, and other things related to Bihar.

History
PatnaBeats was founded in September 2015 by Bashshar Habibullah and was launched by actress Neetu Chandra through her official Facebook page. Later on in February 2020 it's been acquired by Alok Kumar, Rahul Samrat, Prakhyat Kashyap. 

PatnaBeats launched a powerful campaign, "I am brand Bihar" (hashtag: "#IamBrandBihar"), with 23 different pictures of Biharis from different walks of life. The campaign's mission was parallel with the company's agenda to end stereotyping.

The story was widely shared by sources including the BBC, Indian Express, The Telegraph, Aaj Tak, and India Today.

References

Indian companies established in 2015
Mass media companies of India